The District of Columbia Police Coordination Amendment Act of 2001 is an amendment to the National Capital Revitalization and Self-Government Improvement Act of 1997. It was enacted on January 8, 2002. This act was created to fund and increase coordination between law enforcement agencies in the Washington Metropolitan Area.

History
The District of Columbia Police Coordination Amendment Act of 2001 was introduced by Congresswoman Eleanor Norton on September 25, 2001. It was passed by the House of Representatives on September 25, 2001 and was passed by the Senate on December 11. The act was a response to the poor coordination between local, state and federal law enforcement agencies during the September 11 attacks.

Agreements

National Capital Revitalization and Self-Government Improvement Act
The original National Capital Revitalization and Self-Government Improvement Act created agreements between the Metropolitan Police Department and several federal law enforcement agencies. The agencies that made these agreements were supposed to "assist the Department in carrying out crime prevention and law enforcement activities in the District of Columbia." 
The agencies that made agreements with the Metropolitan Police Department in 1997 were:
Amtrak
Board of Governors of the Federal Reserve System
Bureau of Engraving and Printing
Defense Protective Service
Federal Bureau of Investigation Police
General Services Administration, National Capital Region (Federal Protective Service)
United States Mint Police
National Zoological Park Police

District of Columbia Police Coordination Amendment Act
In 2001 the following agencies were added:
11th Security Police Squadron, Bolling Air Force Base
Bureau of Alcohol, Tobacco, Firearms and Explosives
IRS Criminal Investigation Division
Drug Enforcement Administration
Bureau of Citizenship and Immigration Services
Federal Bureau of Investigation
Government Printing Office Police
Library of Congress Police
Marine Corps Law Enforcement 
Department of the Navy Police Division, Naval District Washington
Naval Criminal Investigative Service
United States Postal Inspection Service
Department of State Diplomatic Security
Supreme Court Police
United States Army Criminal Investigation Command, Department of the Army Washington District, 3rd Military Police Group 
United States Army Military District of Washington 
United States Capitol Police
United States Coast Guard
United States Customs Service
United States Marshals Service
United States Park Police
United States Postal Police
United States Secret Service
United States Secret Service Uniformed Division

References

Acts of the 107th United States Congress
Government of the District of Columbia
Law enforcement in Washington, D.C.